The Kome Caves are a group of cave dwellings made out of mud in the district of Berea, Lesotho 25 km east of Teyateyaneng. The caves are still inhabited by the descendants of the original people who built the caves. The site has been classified as a National Heritage Site.

History
The Kome Cave Dwellings were built and protected by Chief Teleka of The Basia(cat) Clan in the early 19th century. The main purpose for the cave dwellings was to serve as a hideout from adversaries during the drought in the late 18th century. The name of Ha Kome comes from the Kome family in the Basia tribe, the first inhabitants of the cave.

Location
The Kome Cave Dwellings are located in the Berea District about a half an hours drive from Teyateyaneng, the capital of the Berea District, and an hours drive from Maseru, the capital of the Maseru District and Lesotho. The geographical coordinates are S 29° 14′ 38.2 E 027° 52′ 00.2. It is 21 km from Blue Mountain Inn, a three star hotel in Teyateyaneng.

References

Geography of Lesotho
Cave dwellings